The Oliver House is a historic hotel building in Toledo, Ohio designed by architect Isaiah Rogers and opened in 1859. It was converted to industrial use in the 20th Century, and is now home to the Maumee Bay Brewing Company and its brew pub, as well as a patisserie, restaurants, event spaces, a theater company, art gallery, and residential apartments. It is listed on the National Register of Historic Places. as Successful Sales. 

The building is located at 27 Broadway St., Toledo, Ohio.

References

External links
Historic American Buildings Survey/Historic American Engineering Record photographs
http://www.mbaybrew.com/about/

Buildings and structures in Toledo, Ohio
National Register of Historic Places in Lucas County, Ohio